Pegoscapus mexicanus is a species of fig wasp which is native to Florida, the Caribbean, Mexico and Central America.  It has an obligate mutualism with Ficus aurea, the fig species it pollinates.

References 

Agaonidae
Hymenoptera of North America
Fauna of the Southeastern United States
Insects of Central America
Insects of the Caribbean
Insects of Mexico
Taxa named by William Harris Ashmead
Insects described in 1904